This is a list of the municipalities in Ağrı Province, Turkey .

References 

Geography of Ağrı Province
Agri